Mikhail Tarasenko (born 21 November 1947, in Taganrog, Rostov Oblast) is a Russian political figure and a deputy of the 8th State Duma. 

After serving in the army, in 1968, Tarasenko started working at the Taganrog Iron & Steel Factory. In 1982, he was appointed The Head of the Labor Protection Department of the Central Council of Russia's Mining and Metallurgical Trade Union. From 1996 to 2012, he was the Head of Russia's Miners' & Metallurgical Workers' Union. In 2007, 2011, 2016, and 2021, he was elected deputy of the 5th, 6th, 7th, and 8th State Dumas, respectively.

Awards  
 Order "For Merit to the Fatherland"
 Medal of P. A. Stolypin

References

1947 births
Living people
United Russia politicians
21st-century Russian politicians
Eighth convocation members of the State Duma (Russian Federation)
Politicians from Taganrog
Russian Academy of State Service alumni
Fifth convocation members of the State Duma (Russian Federation)
Sixth convocation members of the State Duma (Russian Federation)
Seventh convocation members of the State Duma (Russian Federation)
Northwestern Management Institute alumni